The 1989 Clásica de San Sebastián was the 9th edition of the Clásica de San Sebastián cycle race and was held on 12 August 1989. The race started and finished in San Sebastián. The race was won by Gerhard Zadrobilek of the 7-Eleven team.

General classification

References

1989
1989 in Spanish road cycling
1989 UCI Road World Cup
August 1989 sports events in Europe